The 2011–12 AIK IF season is AIK's 28th and current season in the Elitserien ice hockey league (SEL), the top division in Sweden. The regular season began on September 15, 2011 at home against Timrå IK and concluded on March 6, 2012 at home against Skellefteå AIK. The following playoffs began on March 10 and ended on April 7.

AIK improved from previous season by finishing 7th in the regular season and once again qualified for the playoffs. Richard Gynge captured the Håkan Loob Trophy by scoring 28 goals, and Robert Rosén won the scoring league with 60 points (21 goals, 39 assists). Viktor Fasth also won the Honken Trophy for the second consecutive year. Just like last year, AIK were chosen to meet the regular-season champions, Luleå HF, in the quarterfinals. AIK eliminated Luleå in five games and advanced to the semifinals for the second consecutive year, where they would face Skellefteå AIK. AIK were once again eliminated in the semifinals, this time in seven games.

Pre-season

Game log

Regular season

Summary 
AIK's first local derby game of the season, against Djurgårdens IF, was played on September 20, 2011. AIK lost the game 4–2, which recorded AIK's fourth consecutive loss to Djurgården counting the teams' previous season meetings.

By beating Färjestads BK 2–1 in the second round, on away ice in a shootout, AIK recorded their first win against Färjestad in over ten years since 2001, the year when AIK were last relegated from the SEL.

On November 14, 2011, after a one-week break, AIK resumed the season with the second Stockholm derby game of the season against Djurgården. AIK were dressed as the home team. Because of illness, AIK's primary goaltender Viktor Fasth could not play and was replaced by the team's main backup goaltender Markus Svensson. Junior goaltender Niklas Lundström was dressed as the team's backup goaltender in the game. In front of 11,428 spectators, Svensson shutout Djurgården as AIK came on top with a 5–0 win. This was the biggest win in a Stockholm derby since November 15, 2001 (5–0 to Djurgården), AIK's biggest Stockholm derby win since December 28, 2000 (5–0 to AIK), as well as the first shutout win in a Stockholm derby since the November 15, 2001 game. This was also Svensson's first shutout win in the Elitserien league. As a result of the win, AIK received three points and jumped to the ninth spot in the standings at 26 points, the same number of points as Djurgården at that time.

Standings

Game log

Statistics

Players

Goaltenders

Playoffs 
In each series the better-seeded team gets home-ice advantage, meaning that they play four home games. Each series is a best-of-seven, where the team that wins four games advances to the next round. AIK is seeded 7th.

Summary

Game log

Statistics

Players

Goaltenders

Transactions 
AIK's pre-season started with Josh MacNevin, Viktor Fasth, Daniel Bång and Stefan Johansson extending their respective contracts mid-season by two years. Later a published interview revealed that goaltender Christopher Heino-Lindberg and winger Mattias Beck would leave the club prior to the 2011–12 season. A few days later Kent McDonell and Fredrik Carlsson extended their contracts by one year and two years respectively. A few days later it was announced that the junior players Eric Norin, Patric Gozzi, Henrik Nilsson, Mathias Franzén and Andreas Dahlström would be loaned to the HockeyAllsvenskan team Almtuna IS for the 2011–12 season, and then Johannes Salmonsson extended his contract by two years. In mid-April Fredrik Svensson, Victor Ahlström and Oscar Ahlström extended their respective contracts by one year; and shortly after, Linus Videll, Robert Rosén and Tobias Viklund—who all played in Elitserien in the 2010–11 season—were appointed. The appointment of Robert Rosén effectively re-united him and Josh MacNevin, as they played in the same team, Växjö Lakers Hockey, in the 2009–10 season. The same day as those appointments were made, AIK said goodbye to the two Slovak forwards Rastislav Pavlikovský and Richard Zedník, who were acquired mid-season. A few days later Johan P. Andersson left AIK and signed with Timrå IK, Mattias Beck—who had been loaned to Mora IK of the HockeyAllsvenskan (Swe-1) the previous season—signed with Mora IK, and Markus Svensson was presented as a new goaltender in AIK. On April 19, 2011, it was announced that Peter Nolander would leave AIK, as AIK had already found a replacement for him. Jonas Liwing then extended his contract with AIK a week later. In early May, Tobias Ericsson left AIK to sign with Mora IK, and a week later Filip Olsson left the AIK organization and signed with the Division 1 (Swe-2) club Mörrums IK. On May 9 it was announced that the Division 1 player Christopher Aspeqvist had signed a try-out contract with AIK. On September 1, 2011, Aspeqvist extended his contract with the club to one year.

On October 11, 2011, the acquired goaltender Markus Svensson was temporarily loaned to the Swe-1 team IK Oskarshamn for two games. A week later, junior player David Lillieström Karlsson signed a senior contract with AIK. Six days later, acquired forward Linus Videll was sold to Yugra Khanty-Mansiysk of the Kontinental Hockey League (KHL) after just 14 games, for financial reasons.

Final roster 

|}

References 

2011–12 Elitserien season
2011-12